Jones–Johnson–Ballentine Historic District is a national historic district located near Fuquay-Varina, Wake County, North Carolina.  The district encompasses 18 contributing buildings, 3 contributing sites, and 8 contributing structures on the Johnson Farm and the Ballentine Farm near Fuquay-Varina.  The district includes notable examples of Classical Revival and Victorian style architecture.  Notable resources include the William Wesley Johnson House (c. 1860, 1905), The Log Cabin (c. 1780, 1935), James E. Ballentine House (1890), The Creamery (c. 1890), Dairy Barn (1915), a family cemetery and the surrounding farm landscape.

It was listed on the National Register of Historic Places in 1990.

References

Farms on the National Register of Historic Places in North Carolina
Historic districts on the National Register of Historic Places in North Carolina
Victorian architecture in North Carolina
Neoclassical architecture in North Carolina
Buildings and structures in Wake County, North Carolina
National Register of Historic Places in Wake County, North Carolina